Nobutaka Tomatsu (born 8 January 1962) is a Japanese weightlifter. He competed in the men's heavyweight I event at the 1988 Summer Olympics.

References

1962 births
Living people
Japanese male weightlifters
Olympic weightlifters of Japan
Weightlifters at the 1988 Summer Olympics
Place of birth missing (living people)
Asian Games medalists in weightlifting
Weightlifters at the 1986 Asian Games
Asian Games bronze medalists for Japan
Medalists at the 1986 Asian Games
20th-century Japanese people
21st-century Japanese people